Sérgio Petecão (born April 24, 1960) is a Brazilian politician. He has represented Acre in the Federal Senate since 2011.  He is a member of the Social Democratic Party.

References

1960 births
Living people
People from Rio Branco, Acre
Party of National Mobilization politicians
Social Democratic Party (Brazil, 2011) politicians
Members of the Chamber of Deputies (Brazil) from Acre
Members of the Federal Senate (Brazil)